Polygona vermeiji is a species of sea snail, a marine gastropod mollusk in the family Fasciolariidae, the spindle snails, the tulip snails and their allies.

Description

Distribution

References

External links
 Vermeij, G. J. & Snyder, M. A. (2006). Shell characters and taxonomy of Latirus and related fasciolariid groups. Journal of Molluscan Studies. 72(4): 413-424

Fasciolariidae
Gastropods described in 1986